Princess Elena Bibescu (1855 – October 18, 1902) was a Romanian noblewoman and pianist, regarded as one of the greatest pianists of Europe in the nineteenth century.

In France, she became famous for being an outstanding pianist, but also for being a protector of culture. Princess Bibescu held, for three decades, one of the most prestigious salons of Paris in the second half of the 19th century. Marcel Proust, Franz Liszt, Richard Wagner, Pierre Loti, Anatole France, Claude Debussy and Charles Gounod were just a few of the great European personalities who frequented the famous artistic salon.

Career
She was born Elena Costache-Epureanu in 1855 in Bârlad, at the time in the Principality of Moldavia, as daughter of Manolache Costache Epureanu, who later became Prime Minister of Romania and his wife, Princess Maria Sturdza. She married , with whom she had 3 children: Antoine, Emmanuel, and Hélène.

Elena Bibescu debuted on February 14, 1873 in Bucharest, in a charity concert held at Grand Theatre of Bucharest, in the presence of King Carol I and Queen Elisabeth of Romania. Elena Bibescu was a protectress of George Enescu, alongside Queen Elisabeth, and promoted the Romanian musician among the French elite. In 1954, more than 5 decades after her death, Enescu dedicated to her memory the symphonic poem, Vox Maris.

She was a student of the pivotal figure of Russian culture, pianist and composer Anton Rubinstein at the Vienna Conservatory, one of the most prestigious institutions of its kind in the world. Elena Bibescu brilliantly graduated from the Vienna Conservatory, where she was awarded a medal and a diploma of honor.

After returning to Romania in October 1902 and residing in the family's manor in Epureni, a few kilometers away from Bârlad, Elena was transported to Iași after falling ill from cancer. She died shortly afterward on 18 October 1902.

References

1855 births
1902 deaths
People from Bârlad
University of Music and Performing Arts Vienna alumni
Romanian pianists
Romanian women pianists
19th-century pianists
19th-century Romanian women musicians
Women classical pianists
Deaths from cancer in Romania
19th-century women pianists